Wanderlust (stylised as ШАNDԐЯLUЅT) is the fifth studio album by English singer and songwriter Sophie Ellis-Bextor, released on 20 January 2014 by EBGB's. The album marks a sharp shift from Ellis-Bextor's electronic dance roots, incorporating elements of folk, baroque and orchestral music. It was featured as BBC Radio 2's "Album of the Week" on 18 January 2014.

A double-disc repackaged version was released on 3 November 2014 and included a remix version of the album.

Singles
The album's lead single, "Young Blood", was offered as a free download on Ellis-Bextor's official website on 26 March 2013, before being officially released on iTunes on 21 November 2013. The single reached number thirty-four on the UK Singles Chart and number three on the UK Indie Singles Chart. The accompanying music video was directed by Sophie Muller.

On 31 March 2014, "Runaway Daydreamer" was released as the second single from the album. The music video was also directed by Sophie Muller. It peaked at number 29 on the UK Indie Chart.

The album's third single is "Love Is a Camera", which was released on 23 June, with the video being filmed in Florence, Italy on 30 April, by director Sophie Muller. The single was added straight onto the BBC Radio 2's A-list playlist.

"The Deer & the Wolf" was released on 24 August as the fourth and final single lifted from the album. The video was shot in London by up-and-coming director Harry Cauty.

Critical reception

Wanderlust received generally positive reviews from music critics. At Metacritic, which assigns a normalised rating out of 100 to reviews from mainstream critics, the album received an average score of 65 based on 12 reviews, which indicates "generally favorable reviews", while aggregating website AnyDecentMusic? reports a score of 6.1 based on fourteen professional reviews. Gareth James of Clash found the album "quite remarkable", and described the songs as "grand and ambitious." Matthew Horton of Virgin Media wrote that Ellis-Bextor "has decided on a change of tack [...] that has brought out the best in her," and called the songs "almost without exception, marvelous." John Paul Lucas of So So Gay found Wanderlust "bold, ambitious and frequently surprising" and wrote that it "feels like an arrival, and potentially the most important album of her career." Robert Copsey of Digital Spy described it as "a brave excursion into something surprisingly off-kilter for a traditionally top 40 popstar," however he felt that its lyrics sound "occasionally sappy and sentimental." Caroline Sullivan of The Guardian noticed "the preponderance of sweeping string-and-piano arrangements" and noted that "what really sells this album is its forays into eastern European-style pathos."

Louise Bruton of The Irish Times compared the album's sound to the Norwegian folk/pop band Katzenjammer and felt that "as a breakaway from her usual dancefloor dalliances, Sophie chose wisely." Neil McCormick of The Daily Telegraph described Wanderlust as "an odd mix of colourful and melodious songs with thoughtful lyrics and lush, slightly wonky arrangements," while also noticing a "lack [of] an emotional centre." Kate Bennett of musicOMH stated that "Sophie Ellis-Bextor has just abandoned her electropop comfort blanket for a smothering duvet of clichés and ineffectual romanticism," while Hermiony Hobby of The Observer felt that she "sounds like a nine-year-old girl" and called the album's arrangements "more saccharine than stirring." Andy Gill of The Independent noted Wanderlust'''s "Eastern European flavour" and suggested that Ellis-Bextor is "re-positioning herself in the prim Nordic-diva territory of Agnes Obel and Ane Brun." Ludovic Hunter-Tilney of the Financial Times noticed that "she sings with more feeling than her electro-pop days but the album suffers from a plodding pace."

Commercial performanceWanderlust debuted on the UK Albums Chart at number four with 10,844 copies sold in its first week, becoming Ellis-Bextor's highest-charting solo album since 2001's Read My Lips, the revised edition of which peaked at number two in mid 2002. The following week, it fell to number five with sales of 8,520 copies. The album slipped to number nine in its third week, selling 7,231 copies. The album now has the second-longest chart run of any Sophie Ellis-Bextor album (after Read My Lips), having spent fourteen consecutive weeks in the top 75 as of 27 April 2014. It was awarded a Silver certification by the BPI after selling 60,000 copies in the UK.

Wanderlust Tour
Ellis-Bextor supported the album's release with a sold-out and critically acclaimed show at the Bush Hall in London on 21 January 2014. She later went to announce a full-UK tour. Festival dates and a second leg of the tour around the UK were announced in late April. The regular setlist consisted on playing most of the songs from the album (frequent exceptions were "Interlude" and "Wrong Side of the Sun") and very little older hits on the encores, mainly "Murder on the Dancefloor", "Groovejet", "Take Me Home" and "Heartbreak (Make Me a Dancer)".

Sophie won the Best Live Act prize at the AIM Awards held on 2 September 2014 in London.

 Set List 
 "Birth of an Empire"
 "Until the Stars Collide"
 "Runaway Daydreamer"
 "The Deer & the Wolf"
 "Young Blood"
 "When the Storm Has Blown Over"
 "True Faith"
 "Wrong Side of the Sun"
 "When the Lost Don't Want to be Found"
 "13 Little Dolls"
 "Love is a Camera"
 "Cry to the Beat of Band"
 "Take Me Home"
 "Lady (Hear Me Tonight)"
 "Groovejet (If This Ain't Love)"
 "Sing It Back"
 "Heartbreak (Make Me a Dancer)"
 "Murder on the Dancefloor"

Track listing

Personnel
Credits adapted from the liner notes of Wanderlust''.

 Sophie Ellis-Bextor – vocals
 Seton Daunt – guitar
 Dirty Pretty Strings – strings 
 Ed Harcourt – backing vocals, guitar, keyboards, piano, production, samples, synth ; arrangement, conducting 
 Richard Jones – bass
 Amy Langley – cello 
 Gita Langley – violin 
 Rosie Langley – violin 

 Arnulf Lindner – double bass 
 London Bulgarian Choir – choir 
 Michael Nash Associates – art direction
 Sophie Muller – photography
 Miles Showell – mastering
 Wallace Productions – management
 Phil Wilkinson – drums, percussion
 Polly Wiltshire – viola 
 Richard Woodcraft – engineering, mixing

Charts

Certifications

Release history

References

2014 albums
Sophie Ellis-Bextor albums
Baroque pop albums
Folk albums by English artists
Indie pop albums by English artists